François Delapierre (4 November 1970 – 20 June 2015) was a French politician. He served as the national secretary of the Left Party from December 2010 until his death. He was also a regional councillor of Île-de-France from February 2009 until his death. He was previously a member of the Socialist Party from 1986 to 2008. He was born in Paris.

Delapierre died from brain cancer on 20 June 2015 in Paris, aged 44.

References

1970 births
2015 deaths
Deaths from brain cancer in France
French civil servants
Left Party (France) politicians
Politicians from Paris
Socialist Party (France) politicians
Sciences Po alumni
Burials at Père Lachaise Cemetery